Ibrahim Al-Telhi (born 12 July 1994) is a Saudi footballer who plays for Al-Nahda as a winger.

References

 

1994 births
Living people
Saudi Arabian footballers
Association football wingers
Al-Taawoun FC players
Najran SC players
Al-Fateh SC players
Al-Jabalain FC players
Al-Bukayriyah FC players
Wej SC players
Ohod Club players
Jeddah Club players
Al-Nahda Club (Saudi Arabia) players
Saudi First Division League players
Saudi Professional League players
Saudi Second Division players